Coka may refer to:

Čoka, Serbia
Coka, Tibet